Per Håkan Sundell (born 1968, Sweden) is a programmer and computer scientist with roots in the scene and early computer enthusiasts of the eighties, when he was known as PHS of CCS (Computerbrains Cracking Service).

Biography 
Håkan currently holds a Ph.D. in computing science (2004) from Chalmers University of Technology and works as associate professor in software engineering at the School of Business and Informatics, University College of Borås, Sweden.

Creations 
Time Zero (1985) - together with Ale Rivinoja
CCS-Mon (1986)
PlaySID (1990) - together with Ron Birk
CCS64 (1995)
NOBLE (2002) - together with Philippas Tsigas

References 

 Prize for best research article News article with interview at Chalmers University of Technology.
 Chalmersteknologi i nya Java News article with interview at Chalmers University of Technology.
 Den främsta C64-emulatorn är svensk - M3 News article with interview in the magazine called M3.
 Mobiler och handdatorer ger gamla datorspel ett andra liv News article with interview in the scientific news paper Ny Teknik.

External links
CCS64 The homepage of the CCS64 Emulator.
Dr. Håkan Sundell Research homepage.

1968 births
Chalmers University of Technology alumni
Commodore people
Living people
Swedish computer scientists
Swedish computer programmers
University of Gothenburg alumni